Clypeadon is a genus of wasps belonging to the family Crabronidae.

The species of this genus are found in Northern America.

Species:
 Clypeadon bechteli (R.Bohart, 1959) 
 Clypeadon californicus (R.Bohart, 1959)

References

Crabronidae
Hymenoptera genera